Big Neighborhood is the fourteenth solo studio album by jazz guitarist Mike Stern. The 2009 release was produced by Jim Beard and released by Heads Up International. It debuted at number five on the Billboard Top Traditional Jazz Albums chart and was nominated for the 2010 Grammy Award for Best Contemporary Jazz Album.

Overview

Big Neighborhood was Stern's second release on Heads Up, a follow up to 2006's Who Let the Cats Out? Most of the album was recorded in New York City, but Stern also traveled with a rhythm section to Austin, Texas to record with guitarist Eric Johnson, and then to Los Angeles to record with guitarist Steve Vai and drummer Dave Weckl. Vai played guitar on the title track and sitar on "Moroccan Roll".

The album was nominated for the 2010 Grammy Award for Best Contemporary Jazz Album but lost to the Joe Zawinul album 75. This was Stern's sixth nomination in this category. The other nominees were Urbanus by Stefon Harris, Sounding Point by Julian Lage, and At World's Edge by Philippe Saisse.

Critical reception

Jonathan Widran of Allmusic commented on the diversity of styles on "Big Neighborhoor", writing that it "range[s] from blazing jazz fusion to African-tinged exotica and trippy Middle Eastern journeys." He called the release "one block party jazz fusion fans won't want to miss in 2009!"

Bill Meredith quipped in the JazzTimes that the album "simply lacks the unbridled improvisation and interplay of his stage shows" and that "[t]he guests are also so numerous that things feel contrived". He closed his review by opining that "with better sequencing and a solid band ... [it] might not seem so all over the place."

In his review for The Virginian-Pilot, Eric Feber wrote that "It’s a beautiful day in jazz guitarist Mike Stern's Big Neighborhood" and closed with  matter the genre or collaborator, Stern holds his own with lightning-fast, sinewy riffs and impressionistic guitar filigrees."

Tracks
All tracks composed by Mike Stern.
"Big Neighborhood" - 7:40
"6th Street" - 7:49
"Reach" - 5:30
"Song for Pepper" - 5:43
"Coupe de Ville" - 4:36
"Bird Blue" - 5:44
"Moroccan Roll" - 7:06
"Long Time Gone" - 7:52
"Check One" - 7:39
"That's All It Is" - 4:52
"Hope You Don't Mind" - 5:18

Personnel
 Mike Stern – guitar
 Randy Brecker – trumpet
 Bob Franceschini – saxophone
 Bob Malach – saxophone
 Jim Beard – keyboards
 John Medeski – keyboards
 Eric Johnson – guitar
 Steve Vai – guitar, sitar
 Richard Bona – bass guitar, vocals
 Chris Minh Doky – bass
 Lincoln Goines – bass
 Esperanza Spalding – double bass, vocals
 Chris Wood – bass
 Cindy Blackman Santana – drums
 Terri Lyne Carrington – drums
 Lionel Cordew – drums
 Billy Martin – drums
 Dave Weckl – drums

Technical personnel
Jim Beard – producer
David Boyle – engineer
Craig Brock – engineer
Helix Hadar – engineer
Roy Hendrickson – engineer
Phil Magnotti – engineer, mixing
Bill Milkowski – liner notes
John Shyloski – engineer
Ken Sluiter – assistant engineer

Charts

References

2009 albums
Mike Stern albums
Heads Up International albums